Tarek Sabet (born 18 August 1963) is an Egyptian sports shooter. He competed in the mixed trap event at the 1992 Summer Olympics.

References

1963 births
Living people
Egyptian male sport shooters
Olympic shooters of Egypt
Shooters at the 1992 Summer Olympics
Sportspeople from Alexandria